Strathcarron Sports Cars plc was a British car manufacturer based in Hove, East Sussex, in business from 1998 until 2001.

Company Overview
Strathcarron produced two models while in business between 1999 and 2002, the Strathcarron SC-5A, and the Strathcarron SC-6, which in essence was the same as the SC-5A, only with ABS plastic bodywork in place of the more expensive kevlar and carbon fiber. The company's founder, Ian Macpherson, now Lord Strathcarron, is the son of David Macpherson who was a noted motorcyclist and automotive columnist. The goal for the company was to build simple and lightweight cars powered by motorcycle engines. The cars were designed by Reynard and used Triumph motorcycle engines and were minimalist in terms of options and amenities.

Initially, the company planned to send 50 to 60 cars out of their factory once the firm was fully up and running during the year 2000. However, due to changes in the UK's Single Vehicle Approval laws during the time Strathcarron was beginning to sell the cars to customers, the company had to go back and reconsider using the engine out of an automobile in order to legally sell the car for public roadway use. An attempt was made to use the Rover K-Series motor, but financial hardship forced the company to shut down before a working prototype could be completed and road tested.

SC-5A Specifications
Dimensions
Length: 
Width: 
Wheelbase: 
Wheel Track (Front): 
Wheel Track (Rear): 
Weight: 
Seating Capacity: 2
Powertrain
Engine Type: Inline 4
Displacement: 
Sourced from: Triumph Trophy 1200 motorcycle
Valves: 16 valves/4 per cylinder
Horsepower: 
Transmission: 6-speed manual (Sequential)
Drive Wheels: Rear
Engine Placement: Mid-Engined
Handling
Wheels: Front 16x6 - rear 16x7
Tires: Front 205/55/16 - Rear 215/50/17
Brakes: Brembo vented discs with AP brake calipers
Steering: Unassisted rack-and-pinion
Performance
0-60 mph Time: 5.6 seconds

See also
 List of car manufacturers of the United Kingdom

References

External links
 Single Vehicle Approval - Official UK Department of Transport documentation

Defunct motor vehicle manufacturers of England
Vehicle manufacturing companies disestablished in 2001